The 2004 Intercontinental Cup was an association football match that took place on 12 December 2004 between Porto of Portugal, winners of the 2003–04 UEFA Champions League, and Once Caldas of Colombia, winners of the 2004 Copa Libertadores. The match was played at the neutral venue of the International Stadium Yokohama in Yokohama, Japan, in front of 45,748 fans. The match ended 0–0 after extra time, where Porto eventually won 8–7 in the penalty shoot-out. Maniche of Porto, despite being the only Porto player to miss his penalty kick, was named as man of the match.

This was the last Intercontinental Cup final as the competition was subsequently expanded from a single game between European and South American champions into the FIFA Club World Cup, also including North & Central American, Asian, African and Oceanian continental champions.

The 2004 Intercontinental Cup was a football match contested between the winners of the 2003 Copa Libertadores and the 2003 UEFA Champions League. The match was played on December 17, 2004, at the Estadio Santiago Bernabéu in Madrid, Spain. The match was won by Porto, who defeated Once Caldas 3-2. The match was the 44th Intercontinental Cup, an annual football competition organized by Union of European Football Associations (UEFA) and the Confederation of North, Central American and Caribbean Association Football (CONCACAF).

Match details

See also
Intercontinental Cup
UEFA Champions League
Copa Libertadores
FIFA Club World Cup
FC Porto in international football competitions

References

External links
2004 Intercontinental Cup at Rec.Sport.Soccer Statistics Foundation

Intercontinental Cup
Intercontinental Cup
Intercontinental Cup
Intercontinental Cup (football)
Intercontinental Cup 2004
Intercontinental Cup 2004
Intercontinental Cup 2004
Intercontinental Cup (football) matches hosted by Japan
December 2004 sports events in Asia
2000s in Yokohama
Sports competitions in Yokohama
2004 in association football